Majid Ghannad is an Iranian television presenter, producer, and director. He is mostly known for his works in Iran local TV for children, like Fitile Jom'eh Tatileh, School to school and Ghelgheli.  He is also known as Uncle Ghannad among children.

Early life
Majid born in 1954 in Khorramshahr. His father died when majid was 7 years old. After that time, his mother, who was a nurse, was his only maintainer.

He was interested in theater since he was studying in elementary school. In 1975, his teacher, Mohammad Abuyi, who was a writer helped Majid to get into Abadan local TV art works. After that time he became more eager about this work.

When he was studying at high school, he was working for his uncle, who was a carpenter. However, some times he had worked for other people in restaurant.

Career
He started his work in TV shows when he was 28 years old in Abadan local TV (1976). When the Iran–Iraq War began, he continued his work as a director in Isfahan local TV and in 1982, he worked for Khoramabad local TV for a year. After that he came to Tehran to continue his higher education. Meanwhile, he was working for IRIB 2 as a television presenter and director. His weekend shows started from 1983. He got his bachelor's degree in acting from University of Tehran.

He has also worked for House of Cinema, Jam jam TV.

Fitileh was one of his most famous shows, which continued for eight years (2003-2011). In 2011, he stopped working on the show as the presenter and another host was brought to replace him. However, he still served as the producer.

Personal life
He has two daughters and a son.

He goes through physical examination every 8 months and visits a psychologist whenever he needs to talk.

Films and shows
He has created plenty of shows, films, series and exhibitions. Some of the most famous ones are listed below:

School to school (120 episodes)
Play, Happiness, Watching (80 episodes)
Week's show (26 episodes)
Charkhunak (52 episodes)
Distance (short film)
Flower and flower pot (104 episodes)
Hourglass (104 episodes)
Cousins (26 episodes)
Happiness game (52 episodes)
Mr. Ghurghur (26 episodes)
Palam Pulum Pilim (26 episodes)
Twins (26 episodes)
All of my daughters (Film)
City in children's control (Film)
Fitile Jom'eh Tatileh (for 8 years at weekends)
Scarecrow yourself

See also
Dariush Farziaei
Adel Ferdosipour
Kamran Najafzadeh

References

Living people
People from Khorramshahr
1954 births
Iranian television presenters
Iranian television producers
Iranian television directors
Iranian radio and television presenters